José Guillermo Ortiz Picado (born 20 June 1992) is a Costa Rican international footballer who plays as a forward for Costa Rican club Herediano.

Club career

Alajuelense
Ortiz spent four seasons in Alajuelense. He scored 15 goals for Alajuelense in 2016.

Herediano
On January 1, 2017, Ortiz joined Herediano.

D.C. United
On 18 December 2016, Ortiz was loaned to D.C. United in MLS with an option to buy.

He scored his first MLS goal on April 1, 2017, scoring in the 18th minute against the Philadelphia Union.

On 30 May 2017, Ortiz was suspended for one game by Major League Soccer for simulation that led to a decisive penalty in a game against the Vancouver Whitecaps.

He was released by D.C. United on 12 July 2017.

Millonarios
Ortiz joined Colombian side Millonarios on August 6, 2019, on loan from his club Herediano. On August 11, he debuted for the club in the game against Atlético Huila. He scored his first goals on August 14 against Independiente Medellín in 2019 Copa Colombia.

He scored his first goal in 2020 against La Equidad in a 2–2 draw, previously he scored his first hat-tricks in Colombia also against the same opponent.

Ho Chi Minh City
In July 2020, he made a surprise decision by confirmed joining the Vietnamese side Ho Chi Minh City FC, becoming the first full Costa Rican international players, alongside teammate Ariel Francisco Rodríguez, to play in Vietnam.

International career
Ortiz was named to the 23-man squad for the 2017 Copa Centroamericana, making it his first call-up to the senior national team. In Ortiz's debut, he scored twice, in a 3–0 victory over Belize.

International goals
Scores and results list Costa Rica's goal tally first.

Career statistics

References

1992 births
Living people
Costa Rican footballers
Sportspeople from San José, Costa Rica
Association football forwards
L.D. Alajuelense footballers
C.S. Herediano footballers
D.C. United players
Millonarios F.C. players
Ho Chi Minh City FC players
Deportes Tolima footballers
Liga FPD players
Major League Soccer players
Categoría Primera A players
V.League 1 players
Costa Rica international footballers
2017 Copa Centroamericana players
2021 CONCACAF Gold Cup players
Costa Rican expatriate footballers
Expatriate soccer players in the United States
Costa Rican expatriate sportspeople in the United States
Expatriate footballers in Colombia
Costa Rican expatriate sportspeople in Colombia
Expatriate footballers in Vietnam
Costa Rican expatriate sportspeople in Vietnam